King Ecgbert School is a co-educational secondary school with academy status (age range 11–18) in the village of Dore in the south-west of Sheffield, South Yorkshire, England.
The headteacher (from January 2017) is Paul Haigh. The school is named in honour of King Egbert of Wessex, who became recognised as overlord of England at Dore in 829.

Originally opened in 1957 on Furniss Avenue as a girls-only secondary technical school, King Ecgbert eventually became comprehensive in 1969 when it amalgamated with Abbeydale Secondary School and Greystones Secondary when they were closed down. About half its intake comes from local primary schools in Dore and Totley (for example Dore Primary School, Totley All Saints and Totley Primary) and much of the remainder from the Sheaf valley, running from Dore and Totley to the city centre.

The School celebrated its 50th anniversary in 2019, and threw a party to celebrate the occasion along with former students being invited back to the school.

Features 
After two years under construction, a new three-storey building was opened to students in Easter 2005. Previously the school had been split between two sites, 'Mercia' and 'Wessex'. The new building has space for the Sixth Form, a drama studio and an AstroTurf with an indoor sports hall. The school was given good grades in a recent Ofsted report, rising from 'good' to 'outstanding' in May 2013. The school also complies with the UK government's healthy eating plan. The school used to be a Specialist Technology College, until it became an academy in 2012.

In 2013, the school's Sports Hall was renamed to the 'Jessica Ennis Sports Hall', after its Alumna, the Olympic gold medallist Jessica Ennis DBE

The old 'Mercia' School site was demolished in 2005, and construction of a housing estate was completed on the site in 2019, however the school still uses the playing field which was left intact adjacent to the school's original position.

Integrated Resource

The "Integrated Resource" is a unit in King Ecgbert School where students with learning difficulties, problems with anxiety, problems with sociability or any special-needs in the autistic spectrum can go to if they need.

Notable alumni

Matthew Beard, actor
Jessica Ennis, athlete
Gina Higginbottom, academic and nurse
Paul "Silky" Jones, Boxer
Joe Root, cricketer 
Jon Shaw, footballer
Tom Wrigglesworth, comedian and broadcaster

References

External links

King Ecgebrt School's page on Ofsted website

Secondary schools in Sheffield
Academies in Sheffield